Plancia Magna was a prominent woman of Perga in the Roman province of Lycia et Pamphylia who lived in the 1st and 2nd centuries. During her life she was not only a high priestess, but a member of the decurio and a benefactress to the city, funding the restoration of the main city gates between the years AD 119 and 120.

Ancestry, family, and early life

Plancia Magna was the daughter of the Roman Senator Marcus Plancius Varus and the Herodian Princess Julia, daughter of king Tigranes VI of Armenia. Her mother became a priestess and served in the temple of the Ancient Greek Goddess Artemis in Perga.

Magna married the Roman Senator Gaius Julius Cornutus Tertullus, suffect consul in 100 with his friend Pliny the Younger. Magna bore Tertullus a son, Gaius Julius Plancius Varus Cornutus.

Activity in Perga
Plancia Magna is an example of a successful and influential woman from Anatolia. From surviving inscriptions mentioning her and her family, it is understood that they were wealthy and influential citizens in Perga. Due to the generosity of Magna, her father and her brother, they were accepted as the second founders of Perga. They each were given the honorific title of Ktistes or "Founder".

In the reign of Roman Emperor Hadrian, Plancia Magna funded major civic improvements in Perga. These improvements included restoration of the Hellenistic Gates at Perga, a magnificent structure that was the entrance to the city; a horseshoe-shaped courtyard adorned with a number of statues depicting various members of the imperial family and various Greek and Roman deities. These statues were annotated by a series of inscriptions indicating these were her donations; because Plotina is not referred to as diva these inscriptions should be dated before her death in 122 and after that of Salonia Matidia in 119.

Translated from Latin [first two lines]:
to the genius of the city
Plancia Magna daughter of Marcus

Translated from Greek [last two lines]:
to the fortune of the city
Plancia Magna

Magna held the title of high-priestess of the temple of the ancient Greek Goddess Artemis in Perga, as well as the high-priestess of the imperial cult and the high-priestess for life of the mother of the gods.

Magna was honored by the Boule, Demos and Gerousia of Perga with the honorific title of Demiourgos. The name of person who held this annual title was used to identify the year. Demiourgos was the highest civil servant position in the government of Perga. This title was usually reserved for men and through this title she had sponsored the local games held in Perga.

A surviving inscription on a base from a statue erected by the community of Perga, reveals her position in the city:

Plancia Magna
Daughter of Marcus Plancius Varus
and daughter of the city.
Priestess of Artemis
and both first and sole public priestess
of the mother of the gods
for the duration of her life
pious and patriotic.

When Magna died she was buried in a tomb which is located to the right of the Hellenistic Gates.

References

Further reading 
 Sheila Dillon (2010). The Female Portrait Statue in the Greek World. Cambridge University Press, pp. 155–161. 
 Elaine Fantham, Helene Peet Foley, Natalie Boymel Kampen, Sarah B. Pomeroy & H. Alan Shapiro (1995). Women in the Classical World: Image and Text, Oxford University Press, pp. 363, 364f. 
 Charles Gates (2003). Ancient Cities: the Archaeology of Urban Life in the Ancient Near East and Egypt, Greece and Rome, Routledge.

External links
 Plancia Magna, Aurelia Paulina, and Regilla: Civic Donors (last visited 24 March 2017)
Ataman Hotel: Plancia Magna
Plancia Magna Inscription (AE 1965, 210 = IK-54 90)
Statue of Plancia Magna (photo)
Statue of Plancia Magna (photo)
acsearch.info ancient coin search engine: Kings of Armenia

1st-century Romans
2nd-century Romans
1st-century Roman women
2nd-century Roman women
Priestesses of the Roman Empire
1st-century clergy
2nd-century clergy
Herodian dynasty
People from Roman Anatolia
Plancii